The Haralson County Courthouse, located on Courthouse Square in Buchanan, Georgia, is a historic Queen Anne style building built in 1891–92.  It was designed by Alexander C. Bruce and Thomas H. Morgan, Bruce & Morgan.  It was listed on the National Register of Historic Places in 1974.  The courthouse served as the county courthouse from 1892 to 1972;  a modern courthouse less than a mile away has since replaced it.

The old courthouse building currently serves as a museum and the location of the Haralson County Historical Society.

References

Courthouses on the National Register of Historic Places in Georgia (U.S. state)
Queen Anne architecture in Georgia (U.S. state)
Government buildings completed in 1891
Buildings and structures in Haralson County, Georgia
National Register of Historic Places in Haralson County, Georgia
County courthouses in Georgia (U.S. state)